Cake is a flour confection made from flour, sugar, and other ingredients, and is usually baked. In their oldest forms, cakes were modifications of bread, but cakes now cover a wide range of preparations that can be simple or elaborate, and which share features with desserts such as pastries, meringues, custards, and pies.

The most common ingredients include flour, sugar, eggs, fat (such as butter, oil or margarine), a liquid, and a leavening agent, such as baking soda or baking powder. Common additional ingredients include dried, candied, or fresh fruit, nuts, cocoa, and extracts such as vanilla, with numerous substitutions for the primary ingredients. Cakes can also be filled with fruit preserves, nuts or dessert sauces (like custard, jelly, cooked fruit, whipped cream or syrups), iced with buttercream or other icings, and decorated with marzipan, piped borders, or candied fruit.

Cake is often served as a celebratory dish on ceremonial occasions, such as weddings, anniversaries, and birthdays. There are countless cake recipes; some are bread-like, some are rich and elaborate, and many are centuries old. Cake making is no longer a complicated procedure; while at one time considerable labor went into cake making (particularly the whisking of egg foams), baking equipment and directions have been simplified so that even the most amateur of cooks may bake a cake.

History
The term "cake" has a long history. The word itself is of Viking origin, from the Old Norse word "kaka".

The ancient Greeks called cake πλακοῦς (plakous), which was derived from the word for "flat", πλακόεις (plakoeis). It was baked using flour mixed with eggs, milk, nuts, and honey. They also had a cake called "satura", which was a flat heavy cake. During the Roman period, the name for cake became "placenta" which was derived from the Greek term. A placenta was baked on a pastry base or inside a pastry case.

The Greeks invented beer as a leavener, frying fritters in olive oil, and cheesecakes using goat's milk. In ancient Rome, the basic bread dough was sometimes enriched with butter, eggs, and honey, which produced a sweet and cake-like baked good. Latin poet Ovid refers to his and his brother's birthday party and cake in his first book of exile, Tristia.

Early cakes in England were also essentially bread: the most obvious differences between a "cake" and "bread" were the round, flat shape of the cakes, and the cooking method, which turned cakes over once while cooking, while bread was left upright throughout the baking process.

Sponge cakes, leavened with beaten eggs, originated during the Renaissance, possibly in Spain.

Cake mixes

During the Great Depression, there was a surplus of molasses and the need to provide easily made food to millions of economically depressed people in the United States. One company patented a cake-bread mix to deal with this economic situation, and thereby established the first line of cake in a box. In so doing, cake, as it is known today, became a mass-produced good rather than a home- or bakery-made specialty.

Later, during the post-war boom, other American companies (notably General Mills) developed this idea further, marketing cake mix on the principle of convenience, especially to housewives. When sales dropped heavily in the 1950s, marketers discovered that baking cakes, once a task at which housewives could exercise skill and creativity, had become dispiriting. This was a period in American ideological history when women, retired from the war-time labor force, were confined to the domestic sphere, while still exposed to the blossoming consumerism in the US. This inspired psychologist Ernest Dichter to find a solution to the cake mix problem in the frosting. Since making the cake was so simple, housewives and other in-home cake makers could expend their creative energy on cake decorating inspired by, among other things, photographs in magazines of elaborately decorated cakes.

Ever since cake in a box has become a staple of supermarkets and is complemented with frosting in a can.

Varieties

Cakes are broadly divided into several categories, based primarily on ingredients and mixing techniques. 

Although clear examples of the difference between cake and bread are easy to find, the precise classification has always been elusive.

Butter cake

Butter cakes are made from creamed butter, sugar, eggs, and flour. They rely on the combination of butter and sugar beaten for an extended time to incorporate air into the batter. A classic pound cake is made with a pound each of butter, sugar, eggs, and flour. Another type of butter cake that takes its names from the proportion of ingredients used is 1-2-3-4 cake: 1 cup butter, 2 cups sugar, 3 cups flour, and 4 eggs. According to Beth Tartan, this cake was one of the most common among the American pioneers who settled North Carolina. 

Baking powder is in many butter cakes, such as Victoria sponge. The ingredients are sometimes mixed without creaming the butter, using recipes for simple and quick cakes.

Sponge cake

Sponge cakes (or foam cakes) are made from whipped eggs, sugar, and flour. Traditional sponge cakes are leavened only with eggs. They rely primarily on trapped air in a protein matrix (generally of beaten eggs) to provide leavening, sometimes with a bit of baking powder or other chemical leaven added. Egg-leavened sponge cakes are thought to be the oldest cakes made without yeast. 

Angel food cake is a white cake that uses only the whites of the eggs and is traditionally baked in a tube pan. The French Génoise is a sponge cake that includes clarified butter. Highly decorated sponge cakes with lavish toppings are sometimes called gateau, the French word for cake. Chiffon cakes are sponge cakes with vegetable oil, which adds moistness.

Chocolate cake

Chocolate cakes are butter cakes, sponge cakes, or other cakes flavored with melted chocolate or cocoa powder. German chocolate cake is a variety of chocolate cake. Fudge cakes are chocolate cakes that contain fudge.

Coffee cake

Coffee cake is generally thought of as a cake to serve with coffee or tea at breakfast or a coffee break. Some types use yeast as a leavening agent while others use baking soda or baking powder. These cakes often have a crumb topping called streusel or a light glaze drizzle.

Flourless cake
Baked flourless cakes include baked cheesecakes and flourless chocolate cakes.

Layer cakes

Layer cakes are cakes made with layers of sponge or butter cake, filled with cream, jam or other filling to hold the layers together.

One egg cake

One egg cakes are made with one egg. They can be made with butter or vegetable shortening. One egg cake was an economical recipe when using two eggs for each cake was too costly.

Comparison with bread 
Although clear examples of the difference between cake and bread are easy to find, the precise classification has always been elusive. For example, banana bread may be properly considered either a quick bread or a cake. Yeast cakes are the oldest and are very similar to yeast bread. Such cakes are often very traditional in form and include such pastries as babka and stollen.

Special-purpose cakes

Cakes may be classified according to the occasion for which they are intended. For example, wedding cakes, birthday cakes, cakes for first communion, Christmas cakes, Halloween cakes, and Passover plava (a type of sponge cake sometimes made with matzo meal) are all identified primarily according to the celebration they are intended to accompany. The cutting of a wedding cake constitutes a social ceremony in some cultures. The Ancient Roman marriage ritual of confarreatio originated in the sharing of a cake.

Particular types of cake may be associated with particular festivals, such as stollen or chocolate log (at Christmas), babka and simnel cake (at Easter), or mooncake. There has been a long tradition of decorating an iced cake at Christmas time; other cakes associated with Christmas include chocolate log and mince pies.

A Lancashire Courting Cake is a fruit-filled cake baked by a fiancée for her betrothed. The cake has been described as "somewhere between a firm sponge – with a greater proportion of flour to fat and eggs than a Victoria sponge cake – and a shortbread base and was proof of the bride-to-be's baking skills".  Traditionally it is a two-layer cake filled and topped with strawberries or raspberries and whipped cream.

Shapes

Cakes are frequently described according to their physical form. Cakes may be small and intended for individual consumption. Larger cakes may be made to be sliced and served as part of a meal or social function. Common shapes include:
 Bundt cakes
 Cake dress
 Cake balls
 Cake pops
 Conical, such as the Kransekake
 Cupcakes and madeleines, which are both sized for a single person
 Layer cakes, frequently baked in a springform pan and decorated
 Sheet cakes, simple, flat, rectangular cakes baked in sheet pans
 Swiss rolls

Cake flour

Special cake flour with a high starch-to-gluten ratio is made from fine-textured, soft, low-protein wheat. It is strongly bleached and compared to all-purpose flour, cake flour tends to result in cakes with a lighter, less dense texture. Therefore, it is frequently specified or preferred in cakes meant to be soft, light, and/or bright white, such as angel food cake. However, if cake flour is called for, a substitute can be made by replacing a small percentage of all-purpose flour with cornstarch or removing two tablespoons from each cup of all-purpose flour. Some recipes explicitly specify or permit all-purpose flour, notably where a firmer or denser cake texture is desired.

Cooking

A cake can fail to bake properly, which is called "falling". In a cake that "falls", parts may sink or flatten, because it was baked at a temperature that is too low or too hot, when it has been underbaked and when placed in an oven that is too hot at the beginning of the baking process. The use of excessive amounts of sugar, flour, fat or leavening can also cause a cake to fall. A cake can also fall when subjected to cool air that enters an oven when the oven door is opened during the cooking process.

Cake decorating

A finished cake is often enhanced by covering it with icing, or frosting, and toppings such as sprinkles, which are also known as "jimmies" in certain parts of the United States and "hundreds and thousands" in the United Kingdom. The frosting is usually made from powdered (icing) sugar, sometimes a fat of some sort, milk or cream, and often flavorings such as a vanilla extract or cocoa powder. Some decorators use a rolled fondant icing. Commercial bakeries tend to use lard for the fat, and often whip the lard to introduce air bubbles. This makes the icing light and spreadable. Home bakers either use lard, butter, margarine, or some combination thereof. Sprinkles are small firm pieces of sugar and oils that are colored with food coloring. In the late 20th century, new cake decorating products became available to the public. These include several specialized sprinkles and even methods to print pictures and transfer the image onto a cake.

Special tools are needed for more complex cake decorating, such as piping bags and various piping tips, syringes and embossing mats. To use a piping bag or syringe, a piping tip is attached to the bag or syringe using a coupler. The bag or syringe is partially filled with icing which is sometimes colored. Using different piping tips and various techniques, a cake decorator can make many different designs. Basic decorating tips include open star, closed star, basketweave, round, drop flower, leaf, multi, petal, and specialty tips. An embossing mat is used to create embossed effects. A cake turntable that cakes are spun upon may be used in cake decoration.

Royal icing, marzipan (or a less sweet version, known as almond paste), fondant icing
(also known as sugar paste), and buttercream are used as covering icings and to create decorations. Floral sugarcraft or wired sugar flowers are an important part of cake decoration. Cakes for special occasions, such as wedding cakes, are traditionally rich fruit cakes or occasionally Madeira cakes, that are covered with marzipan and iced using royal icing or sugar-paste. They are finished with piped borders (made with royal icing) and adorned with a piped message, wired sugar flowers, hand-formed fondant flowers, marzipan fruit, piped flowers, or crystallized fruits or flowers such as grapes or violets.

Food safety

The shelf life of cakes packages for commercial sale depends on several factors. Cakes are intermediate moisture products prone to mold growth. Commercial cakes are frequently and commonly exposed to different mold varieties before they are packaged for sale, including Aspergillus flavus and various Penicillins, and Aspergillus niger. Preservatives and oxygen absorbents are currently used to control and inhibit mold growth.

The CDC has recommended not to eat raw cake batter because it can contain E. coli. Raw flour can contain bacteria and needs to be cooked like other foods.

See also

 List of cakes
 List of baked goods
 List of desserts
 Pie
 Torte
 Turnover

References

External links

 

 
World cuisine
European cuisine
Articles containing video clips
Desserts
Types of food